Páraic Fanning (born 1970) is an Irish hurling manager and former player who served as the manager of the Waterford senior hurling team for the 2019 season.

Management and coaching career

Mount Sion
In January 2005, Fanning succeeded Jim Greene as manager of the Mount Sion senior hurling team. On 23 October 2006, he guided Mount Sion to the Waterford Championship title after a 2-13 to 0-12 defeat of Ballygunner in the final.

James Stephens
As manager of the James Stephens senior hurling team in Kilkenny, Fanning guided the club to the final of the Kilkenny Championship on 26 October 2008. James Stephens were defeated by Ballyhale Shamrocks on a scoreline of 2-11 to 0-12 on that occasion.

Waterford
On 9 November 2009, Fanning joined the Waterford senior hurling management team as a selector under Davy Fitzgerald. In his first season in the role, he helped guide Waterford to a Munster final defeat of Cork after a replay. In September 2011, Fanning declined to put his name forward for the vacant managers' position after the resignation of Fitzgerald.

Wexford
In November 2016, Fanning joined the Wexford senior hurling management team under Davy Fitzgerald as a selector. During his first year as a selector, Fanning helped secure promotion to Division 1A of the National Hurling League. Later that season he helped guide Wexford to their first Leinster Championship defeat of Kilkenny since 2004 as well as a first Leinster final appearance since 2008.

Waterford
On 17 September 2018, Fanning was appointed to succeed Derek McGrath as manager of the Waterford senior hurling team. He was joined on the management team by James Murray and Patrick Kearney who acted as selectors. On 2 August 2019, it was announced that Fanning would be stepping down as Waterford manager after one year in charge.

Career statistics

Honours

Player
Waterford Regional Technical College
Fitzgibbon Cup (1): 1992

Mount Sion
Munster Senior Club Hurling Championship (1): 2002
Waterford Senior Hurling Championship (5): 1988, 1994, 1998, 2000, 2002

Waterford
National Hurling League Division 2 (1): 1994-95

Management
Waterford Regional Technical College
Fitzgibbon Cup (1): 1995

Mount Sion
Waterford Senior Hurling Championship (1): 2006

Waterford
Munster Senior Hurling Championship (1): 2010

References

1970 births
Living people
Alumni of Waterford Institute of Technology
Hurling managers
Hurling selectors
Mount Sion hurlers
Waterford inter-county hurlers
Waterford IT hurlers